No. 5, 1948 is a painting by Jackson Pollock, an American painter known for his contributions to the abstract expressionist movement. It was sold on 22 May 2006 for $140 million, a new mark for highest ever price for a painting, not surpassed until April 2011.

Composition
The painting was created on fibreboard, also known as composition board, measuring 8’ x 4’. For the paint, Pollock chose to use liquid paints. More specifically, they were synthetic resin paints (gloss enamel) but are referred to as oil paints for classification of the work. On inspection it was grey, brown, white and yellow paint drizzled in a way that many people still perceive as a "dense bird’s nest". Initial reactions to the work were underwhelming:

Damage and rework

The painting has been modified by Pollock since it was originally created. During January 1949, it was being shown in a solo Pollock show at the Betty Parsons gallery. It was from here that Alfonso A. Ossorio decided to purchase a "paint drip" composition; he chose No. 5, 1948 and paid $1,500. It was the only canvas sold from the show. At some point, presumably during the moving process, the painting became damaged, according to Grace Hartigan. "Home Sweet Home [the shipping company] came in with a painting in one hand and a lump of paint from the center of the painting in the other hand". Hartigan gave Pollock some paint and he patched the painting before it went to Ossorio, saying "He’ll never know, never know". When the painting was subsequently delivered to Ossorio, he claimed that he noticed "a portion of the paint - actually the skin from the top of an opened paint can - had slid" leaving a "nondescript smear amidst the surrounding linear clarity," as he explained in a 1978 lecture at Yale. Pollock offered to rework the painting but, according to Hartigan, he "repainted the whole thing again" and stated that "He'll never know. No one knows how to look at my paintings, he won’t know the difference." After three weeks, Ossorio visited Pollock's studio to inspect the painting. Ossorio was confronted with an artwork which was repainted onto fiberboard, with "new qualities of richness and depth" as a result of Pollock's "thorough but subtle repainting." It was clear that Ossorio still liked the painting despite the rework, and continued to attest that the "original concept remained unmistakably present, but affirmed and fulfilled by a new complexity and depth of linear interplay. It was, and still is a masterful display of control and disciplined vision." Pollock repaired the damage to the painting by completely repainting the original, in contrast to how other artworks are repaired. The reconstruction had not only retained but reinforced the metaphysical concept of the painting, and has become what Ossorio calls "a wonderful example of an artist having a second chance".

Ownership
Jackson Pollock: 1948 – January 1949
Alfonso A. Ossorio: January 1949 – Unknown
Samuel Irving Newhouse, Jr.: Unknown
David Geffen: Unknown – November 2006
Efthimios Hatzis

According to a report in The New York Times on November 2, 2006, the painting was sold by David Geffen, founder of Geffen Records and co-founder of DreamWorks SKG, to David Martinez, managing partner of Fintech Advisory Ltd, in a private sale for a record inflation-adjusted price of $140 million. It is speculated that Geffen sold the painting, along with two others, to raise enough funds to bid for the Los Angeles Times. 
The sale was reportedly brokered by Sotheby's auctioneer Tobias Meyer, however, the law firm of Shearman & Sterling, LLP, issued a press release on behalf of its client, David Martinez, to announce that contrary to recent articles in the press, Martinez does not own the painting or any rights to acquire it. In addition to the refutation issued by Shearman & Sterling, the auction expert Josh Baer indicated that Martinez was not the buyer of the painting.

Popular references
The lyrics of The Stone Roses song "Going Down" include a reference to the painting: "(There) she looks like a painting - Jackson Pollock's Number 5..."  The Stone Roses' guitarist John Squire created cover artwork for many of the band's releases on Silvertone Records in a style similar to that of Jackson Pollock.

The painting played a central role in the film  Ex Machina (2015), in which billionaire tech firm CEO Nathan Bateman (Oscar Isaac) owns the painting and uses it as an object lesson for the protagonist Caleb Smith (Domhnall Gleeson), noting that No. 5, 1948 would never have come into existence if Jackson Pollock only painted what he already knew.  This is contrasted to the way an AI comes to know, thus emphasizing the problem of consciousness and epistemology.

See also

List of most expensive paintings

References

External links
Number 5, 1948 by Jackson Pollock
No.5 1948 by Jackson Pollock
Discussion by Janina Ramirez and Marcus du Sautoy: Art Detective Podcast, 01 Mar 2017

1948 paintings
Abstract expressionism
Paintings by Jackson Pollock